Spas Bukhalov (Cyrillic: Спас Бухалов; born 14 November 1980) is a Bulgarian pole vaulter.

He won the 2001 Balkan Games and finished sixth at the 2007 European Indoor Championships. He also competed at the Olympic Games in 2004 as well as the World Championships in 2003 and 2007 without reaching the final.

His personal best jump is 5.82 metres, achieved in June 2007 in Sofia. This is the Bulgarian, and Balkan, record.

He was born in Plovdiv.

Competition record

References

1980 births
Living people
Sportspeople from Plovdiv
Bulgarian male pole vaulters
Olympic athletes of Bulgaria
Athletes (track and field) at the 2004 Summer Olympics
Athletes (track and field) at the 2008 Summer Olympics
World Athletics Championships athletes for Bulgaria